= Amir Sedighi (sports administrator) =

President of Wushu Federation Islamic Republic of Iran

Vice President of Kung Fu Committee, World Wushu Federation Personal details

Personal details
- Born: 3 April 1984 (age 42) Tehran, Iran

Amir Sedighi (Persian: امیر صدیقی, born 3 April 1984 in Tehran) is an Iranian sports administrator and the president of the Iran Wushu Federation.

== Career ==
Sedighi was first elected as the president of the Iran Wushu Federation in 2020

In 2023, Sedighi was re-elected for another term as president of the federation.

During his tenure, he has worked closely with the National Olympic Committee of Iran to develop the sport at the grassroots and professional levels.
